German submarine U-355 was a Type VIIC U-boat of Nazi Germany's Kriegsmarine during World War II. The submarine was laid down on 4 May 1940 at the Flensburger Schiffbau-Gesellschaft yard at Flensburg, launched on 5 July 1941, and commissioned on 29 October 1941 under the command of Kapitänleutnant Günter La Baume. After training with the 5th U-boat Flotilla, U-355 was transferred to the 11th U-boat Flotilla, based at Bergen in Norway, for front-line service from 1 July 1942. The boat went missing on 1 April 1944 while on patrol, and was never heard from again.

Design

German Type VIIC submarines were preceded by the shorter Type VIIB submarines. U-355 had a displacement of  when at the surface and  while submerged. She had two shafts and two  propellers.

U-355 was fitted with five  torpedo tubes (four fitted at the bow and one at the stern), fourteen torpedoes, one  SK C/35 naval gun, 220 rounds, and a  C/30 anti-aircraft gun. The boat had a complement of between forty-four and sixty.

Service history
U-355 was ordered by the Kriegsmarine on 26 October 1939. She was laid down about six months later at the Flensburger Schiffbau-Gesellschaft yard at Flensburg, on 4 May 1940. Just over a year and a month later, U-355 was launched on 5 July 1941. She was formally commissioned later that year on 29 October 1941.

Patrols
U-355 sailed from Kiel on 1 June 1942, arriving at Skjomenfjord, near Narvik, six days later. She sailed on her first combat patrol ten days later, on 16 June, and headed out into the Barents Sea.

There, on 7 July 1942, she sank the 5,082 GRT British merchant ship , dispersed from Convoy PQ 17, en route to Arkhangelsk, carrying six vehicles, 36 tanks, seven aircraft and 2,409 tons of military stores. The ship, hit by three torpedoes, sank within 10 minutes around 17 miles west of Novaya Zemlya. Of the crew, 29 men, seven gunners, and two naval signalmen were killed. The master and 12 men landed at Pomorski Bay, Novaya Zemlya. Another seven survivors took shelter on the American merchant ship , (also of PQ 17), which had run aground and been abandoned on North Gusini Shoal, Novaya Zemlya, and were later rescued by a Soviet survey ship. The U-boat returned to Narvik on 12 July after 27 days at sea.

This was U-355s only success despite sailing on another eight patrols operating against the Arctic convoys between July 1942 and April 1944, totaling 187 days at sea.

Fate
On 1 April 1944, during her ninth patrol, U-355 reported from approximate position  while in pursuit of Convoy JW 58. She was never heard from again, and was listed as missing, together with 52 hands on board, on 4 April 1944.

Previously recorded fate
The attack was against , inflicting medium damage.

Wolfpacks
U-355 took part in five wolfpacks, namely:
 Eisteufel (21 June – 9 July 1942) 
 Nebelkönig (27 July – 14 August 1942) 
 Eisbär (27 March – 15 April 1943) 
 Monsun (19 – 21 October 1943) 
 Blitz (26 March – 4 April 1944)

Summary of raiding history

References

Bibliography

 Axel Neistle : German U-Boat Losses during World War II (1998). 

World War II submarines of Germany
German Type VIIC submarines
U-boats commissioned in 1941
U-boats sunk in 1944
Ships built in Flensburg
Missing U-boats of World War II
1941 ships
U-boats sunk by unknown causes
Maritime incidents in April 1944